Jaivon Heiligh (born September 2, 1999) is an American professional Canadian football wide receiver for the Winnipeg Blue Bombers of the Canadian Football League (CFL). He played college football at Coastal Carolina. Heiligh signed with the Cincinnati Bengals as an undrafted free agent in 2022 but was released prior to the season.

High school career 
Heiligh attended Venice High School in Venice, Florida. He would set Florida state high school records in his senior year. He broke the records for career receiving yards and the single season records for catches, yards, and touchdowns. His final stats for the year were 32 touchdowns, 2,359 yards and 131 receptions. Heiligh and fellow Coastal Carolina quarterback Bryce Carpenter led Venice to a state championship. Heiligh was a three-star recruit and he committed to Coastal Carolina University.

College career 
In four years at Coastal Carolina, Heiligh played in 45 games totaling 191 catches, 2,825 yards, and 22 touchdowns. He was named to the First-team All-Sun Belt twice in 2020 and 2021 during his junior and senior seasons. In 2020, Heiligh set a Cure Bowl record tallying 13 catches in the 2020 edition of the bowl.  He helped lead Coastal Carolina to their first ever bowl victory in the 2021 Cure Bowl in a 47–41 win. In the game, Heiligh became the Coastal Carolina leader in receiving yards in a season. Heiligh entered the 2022 NFL Draft at the end of his collegiate career.

Professional career

Cincinnati Bengals 
Heiligh signed with the Cincinnati Bengals as an undrafted free agent on May 13, 2022. He was waived on August 22.

Winnipeg Blue Bombers 
Heiligh signed with the Winnipeg Blue Bombers of the CFL on August 30, 2022.

References

External links 
 Winnipeg Blue Bombers bio
 Cincinnati Bengals bio
 Coastal Carolina Chanticleers bio

Coastal Carolina Chanticleers football players
1999 births
Living people
People from Venice, Florida
Players of American football from Florida
American football wide receivers
Cincinnati Bengals players
Winnipeg Blue Bombers players